Roberto Núñez may refer to:
 Roberto Núñez (gymnast)
 Roberto Núñez (footballer)